Clifton Hall may refer to:

Buildings 
 Clifton Hall, Cheshire, an 18th-century country house in England, adjacent to Rocksavage
 Clifton Hall, Cumbria, a 15th-century manor house in England
 Clifton Hall, Nottingham, a country house in Clifton, Nottingham, England
Clifton Hall (Havertown, Pennsylvania), a historic mansion

Schools 
 Clifton Hall School, a school near Edinburgh, Scotland
 Clifton Hall Girls' Grammar School, a former school at Clifton Hall, Nottingham, England

Other 
 Clifton Hall Colliery, at Clifton, Greater Manchester (historically in Lancashire), England
 Clifton A. Hall (1826–1913), Rhode Island architect

See also 
Clifton (disambiguation)#Historic sites